Daphnella phyxelis is a species of sea snail, a marine gastropod mollusc in the family Raphitomidae.

Description
The length of this broken shell may have been 12 mm long. The holotype consists of the protoconch and two subsequent whorls.

Distribution
This marine species occurs off Natal, South Africa.

References

External links
 

Endemic fauna of South Africa
phyxelis
Gastropods described in 1964